The KX series of telephone boxes in the United Kingdom was introduced by BT (British Telecom) in 1985. Following the privatisation of BT in 1984, the company decided to create a newly designed and improved take on the British telephone box, which at this point consisted of only red telephone boxes which BT had recently acquired, the most common being the iconic K6 box. These red boxes were considered flawed in parts by BT for several reasons, including cost, lack of ventilation, accessibility and maintenance. BT announced the £160 million series of new boxes, the KX series designed by GKN, as well as announcing the eventual replacement of all existing telephone boxes. The main telephone box in the KX range is the KX100. Upon launch, there were five models in total. The boxes were produced at a rate of 5,000 a year, with the total count of all BT-owned kiosks reaching 137,000 by 1999, a number which has since decreased by more than seventy per cent.

Whilst the updated functions of the KX series were praised, the designs were widely criticised and were seen as inferior to the red telephone boxes. The plan to replace the red boxes was also criticised. Many of the models in the KX series were revamped graphically after BT changed their logo in 1991, and production of the KX100 stopped in 1996 with its replacement, the KX+, attempting to address the criticisms that the original KX100 had received by revising its design to incorporate elements of older red telephone boxes. Later versions of the KX+ incorporated broadband connection. BT was reported to have stopped making telephone boxes altogether in 2001, although this was later denied with the introduction of the ST6 in 2007, which saw the end of the KX series.

Background
In 1980, preparing for privatisation, Post Office Telephones, who owned all of the United Kingdom's telephone boxes, except those in Hull, was renamed British Telecom, later to become simply BT. The most common telephone box in the United Kingdom was the K6 red telephone box, introduced in 1935. The newly formed BT underwent two telephone box projects in 1981. The most successful of the two was the introduction of phonecard-operated telephone kiosks in July after a successful trial, with the phones in the kiosks being named Cardphones. The other project was painting several of the remaining red telephone boxes in yellow, BT's new corporate colour, although upon the announcement in February 1981, it was stated that all of the red telephone boxes would be converted. This was harshly received by the public, with the Daily Mail launching a campaign "against the yellow peril" and questions were asked in Parliament. In the House of Lords, the Earl of Gowrie, the Minister of State for Employment, called on BT "to abandon this ridiculous scheme". In the House of Commons, Mark Lennox-Boyd MP asked the then Prime Minister, Margaret Thatcher, if she would treat the decision "with the greatest possible dismay". Thatcher, who herself was responsible for the privatisation, would only say that she could "see my honourable Friend's point".

Campaigning worked and BT shortly announced that only 90 of the 77,000 remaining traditional boxes had been painted different colours, that it was "as an experiment" and that no final decision had been reached. Nonetheless, whilst they had sympathized with what the public saw as a cultural icon, BT quickly turned their attention to what they saw as flaws in all of Britain's telephone boxes. They considered them outdated and no longer of need to the public, finding that few people like using them, and noted their expensive cost, difficult maintenance and noted how they could not be used by handicapped people. Furthermore, the boxes were noted for a lack of ventilation and little space. Although British Telecom had already introduced the yellow Booth 7A ("Oakham") kiosks in 1980 to several locations with limited floor space or extreme vandalism, it was with their privatisation in late 1984, that BT began planning for a scheme of new telephone boxes which improved on the previous telephone boxes and addressed their concerns.

Launch
In early 1985, British Telecom announced a £160 million modernisation scheme for the public telephone network inherited from the General Post Office. Described as "a major improvement to the public telephone service", the "new designs that were to be the most perfect telephone kiosks you could imagine." They were both BT's first standardised telephone booths and their first altogether, having only been privatised less than half a year earlier. The new telephone boxes were named the KX series. Whilst it is unknown what the initials stand for, it is believed the "K" stands for kiosk, following the Post Office telephone box naming system.

The introduction of the new kiosks was also to see the eventual replacement of all existing prior telephone boxes. In January 1985, Nick Kane, the Director of Marketing for BT Local Communications Services, announced the replacement plan and stated they were being replaced because they "no longer meet the needs of our customers. Few people like to use them. They are expensive and difficult to clean and maintain and cannot be used by handicapped people".

The first KX to be installed, a KX100, was unveiled in Leicester Square, London. BT later stated the KX models "were cheaper to maintain, more resistant to vandalism and were designed to blend in with any surroundings. Special attention was paid to environmental considerations, acoustics, weather protection, lighting and ventilation after intensive market research was conducted into customers' needs. The designs assisted customers with disabilities and allowed access to wheelchair users."

The KX series was not the first attempt to replace the red telephone box with regards to easier access, lower maintenance and brighter lighting, as they follow Post Office Telephone's "Croydon" telephone boxes from 1972. The Croydon boxes, which featured a black handset silhouette with bright yellow paintwork, were erected in Croydon, Surrey, as an experimental prototype to replace the red telephone boxes. However, whilst the trials were successful, the quality of the materials and design made it too expensive for the Post Office to mass-produce and the design was not adopted. Regardless, the design of the Croydon boxes proved an important influence on the KX100. It was also described as looking "quite stunning" and as influencing the Australian Telstra telephone boxes.

Original models
The original KX telephone booths were designed by GKN and DCA (David Carter Associates) and are of light-weight construction and use an aluminum frame clad in stainless steel panels with anodised aluminium edging. They were also fitted with sound proofing, vandal-resistant panelling and "better lighting." As had recently been retrofitted to several existing red telephone boxes, many of the coin-operated KX telephone boxes used the BT Payphone 600.

Kiosks of the KX series were introduced at a rate of 5,000 a year, and by 1999, the combined total of the KX series and acquired Post Office telephone boxes had reached 137,000. There were 100,000 KX100s introduced alone, although only 40,500 remain. Although green bins to dispose of used BT phonecards had been added to already existing kiosks, the phonecard-operated KX kiosks were the first to be introduced with them, although a minority of phonecard-operated KX kiosks did not feature the bin. BT further tightened a number of these bins in late 1992 to take extra care that people can not steal disposed cards from them.

KX100

The first and most common KX, designed to be the direct successor to the K6, the KX100 is a four-sided rectangular box with a flat roof. Aside from the back panel, which is formed of stainless steel panels, the three other sides of the box are made of glass, with two large window panels set above and beneath a slim, black plastic modesty panel, also with a black plastic trim around the windows. The same three sides of the booth stop short of the ground to provide ventilation, another improvement on the non-ventilated K6, and for litter accumulation. Initial deliveries had cylindrical legs, for leveling on site, a flat-sheet roof with upturned edges and a multi-panel back. A slightly updated model known as the Mk2 soon followed, without the adjustable legs and with a single sheet back panel and the more familiar 'biscuit tin lid' roof.

At launch, KX100s had smoked glass windows with lettering and logos printed on the inside face. To improve visibility of the kiosks - in particular during daylight hours - the printing was first moved onto the outside surface of the glass and then the smoked glass was dropped altogether. Later kiosks were all fitted with clear glass.

The door of the kiosk has a light action and features a bright-coloured moulded plastic panel and handle for easier opening than previous boxes. For the first KX100s, this part was bright yellow, whilst the Phonecard variants used a bright green. The payphone inside the coin-operated version was originally yellow with a blue phone, but this was later phased out. The upper glass window panels carried the company logo, which upon launch, was the yellow dotted British Telecom 'T' logo. Changes to the panel and handle colour and BT logo were made in 1991 (see 1991 revamp), changes which adorn almost all remaining KX100s.

The KX100 was designed to be supplied with or without a door, depending on requirements, with the door version designed to be located on sites where complete weather and acoustic protection is needed. The overall unit was designed to be wide enough to allow wheelchair access. The open booth is designed for use on quieter sites yet still provides good weather protection and ease of access for the disabled. They can be used on single sites or suited back to back or side by side.

KX200

The KX200 is a hooded unit provided as a single or double pedestal version. Designed to be suitable for location in most street sites but also to be positioned indoors where acoustic protection is needed. They were designed to be especially accessible for people using wheelchairs and, as with the KX100, they are sometimes positioned back to back.

It consists of a back panel, a flat roof which also supports two glass panels which stretch down the booth but stop far short of the ground. These panels sport the BT logo.

KX300

The KX300 is a triangular unit designed so it could be used in groups, although many were erected alone. The triangular design of the KX300 ensures acoustic and weather protection. It was also designed to enable full use of available floor space and to provide better siting flexibility. As with the KX100, it has raised sides to prevent litter accumulation.
There are two versions, one with two glass sides, the other with one glass side and one fabricated side with acoustic panels and fittings for directory holders. It was essentially a triangular-based variant of the KX100. Several KX300s were fitted with doors that resemble the KX100 doors, although many were not.

KX410 and KX420
The KX410 and KX420 are two hooded phone booths on posts created specifically for sites with little available ground space or sites which are prone to vandalism. As such, there is no space for directories or customer instructions, with the booth structures being made of aluminium alone, with the BT logo being on both the left and right of the structures, whilst hooded is a simple telephone. They were also considerably shorter than the other designs. The KX410, unlike the K420, was suitable for surface mounting.

These were not BT's first attempt at a post-situated telephone booth, as they follow the Booth 7A (or "Oakham" booths as they became known) which was a yellow booth used in areas of extreme vandalism introduced some years earlier.

KX520
For use indoors, such as in shopping centres, another design, the KX520, was introduced. This is essentially a telephone mounted to a post with two small windows joined at the top of the booth to the left and right whilst topped by a hood, underneath which is an extending tab which features the BT logo.

Public reaction
Red Phone Box, a website dedicated to the history of British telephone boxes, said that "nobody could deny the functionality of the designs as their main objectives were to be easy for disabled people to use and very easy to maintain, but everybody could deny the attractiveness of the designs." BT later said that although the public liked parts of the designs, such as "the fact that they were lighter, more airy and more accessible for people with disabilities than the traditional style, customers felt that there was still room for improvement. Popular opinion was that the square shape seemed clinical and that something softer and more rounded would be preferable." The scheme to replace the already existing red telephone boxes provoked a strong reaction from many members of the general public, with many disapproving of the removal of the red kiosks. Despite public campaigning to revert the plan to remove the red boxes, and unlike with the campaign protesting against the yellow telephone boxes several years earlier, BT did not respond, and whilst some red telephone boxes remained, the KX project was completed in 1988.

The KX's reputation has not improved with age. In 2001, The Guardian referred to the KX100 as "utterly bland" and noting that since its introduction, BT "has done its utmost to turn the phone box from one of the most famous and elegant pieces of street furniture into the most boringly ugly. It might be more vandal proof, more accessible and more modern (in the worst sense of the word) but the KX100, even when feebly capped in a fake Gilbert Scott-style crown, looks plain nasty."

Alan Powers, an architectural historian who led the Thirties Society against BT newcomers in the mid-1980s, said "the clutter is appalling" and "nobody has made a worthy successor to Scott's [red telephone box]. They're all utterly banal. Though I have recently seen a new phone in Bloomsbury [London] that is very, very elegant. Maybe BT has finally got it right." It was reported in 2008 that a local from Ffair Rhos, Cadwgan, uses a KX100 yards from his house to contact friends and run his business, as well as cleaning it and opening his window to hear it call, noting he does this so that BT will not remove the box, and that he will not have a home phone installed to help this.

BT's telephone boxes in the UK soon saw a rival with the introduction of Mercury Communications own set of telephone booths, which were launched on 27 July 1988 with 26 booths at Waterloo station, London. The Machin-designed Mercury booth was at best accepted by the public and, at worst, positively hated. Examples of the response included "something from outer space", "pieces of fairground machinery" and "demented bird tables - complete with perches." but, and much more importantly to Mercury, they turned out to be non-profitable. The Mercury payphone sites closed down in 1995, with many of the sites taken over by Interphone, who went on to replace the Machin booths with their own housings.

In the 1988 Quality of Service report, the UK's public payphone system was listed as having a 96% reliability, compared to only 72% in 1987. As a result of the programme, there were 80,000 of the stainless steel design kiosks in service by 1996, in addition to 30,000 hooded or canopied phones and 15,000 of the original red telephone boxes. In 2001, BBC reported that the transition from the classic red telephone boxes to the KX telephone boxes was successful in reducing vandalism.

1991 revamp
BT changed their logo in 1991, now featuring a new typeface for the newly shortened name "BT" (prior to this they used their full name British Telecom), and an unpopular stylized figure of a piper. The KX100, 200 and 300 were updated accordingly. The coin-operated KX100 now featured a pink moulded plastic panel and handle, where as before it was yellow. Variations of the new logo now featured on all booths in place of the 'T' logo. The variations were namely a coloured version, a grey version and a larger, grey piper on its own. The typeface used to identify the type of box atop the entrance (i.e. "Telephone" or "Phonecard") was changed, now featuring an italicized serif font, often beneath a red line. Certain boxes in mostly Welsh-speaking parts of Wales use "Teleffon" instead of "Telephone" on the box. The KX410 and 420 were not revamped, and remain today in their original 1985 guise. The logo on the KX520 features a full colour version of the BT logo.

The revamp was followed by the installation of the BT's 100,000th telephone box, a KX100 at Dunsop Bridge, Lancashire, on 29 June 1992, after the village was recently named the closest to the centre of the British Isles. Upon installation, BT also included a commemorative plaque to explain its significance reading "You are calling from the BT payphone that marks the centre of Great Britain." In fact, the phone is 4.2 miles (6.8 km) from the true centre. The telephone box was unveiled by Sir Ranulph Fiennes, and in BT's A1141 list of unique alphabetical Telephone Exchange codes, the code for Dunsop Bridge is DSB. Whilst the BBC noted in 2002 that the box is the village's "monument", local postmaster and shop owner Phil Woodhead said the town did not capitalise on its status, saying "there is only that payphone really... we haven't put up big signs or anything like that. If this was a bigger town with more shops, then maybe we would do something, but because we are so small, there is really no-one to push it."

KX+

In 1996, BT, having acknowledged the negative reaction to the original KX models, made an attempt to win the public over and revisited the KX100 and built upon its design to improve its appeal and add some character. The new updated version was named the KX+, also known as the KXplus, the KXPlus, the KX100 Plus or the KX100+. It is essentially an updated and taller version of the KX100. It differs from the KX100 in that the 'waistband' in its door and sides is lower, and the colour used in the midsection trim panel and remodelled door handle also now matches the newly introduced trim panel at the top. In a nod to earlier Post Office kiosks and following the negative feedback on the KX100's design, it features a domed, plastic roof (modelled on those of the K2 and K6). This said, the dome also brought other benefits to BT. The enhanced model was now taller and more visible than the boxes of BT's competitors, and it also offered valuable extra space for future developments, such as public wi-fi hotspot equipment. The earliest KX+ kiosks carried signage on the door and side lintels and the domed roof. The interior of the booths are fitted with a large illuminated display panel. They also contained a small seat and a shelf for writing or placing property. They featured a lower handle on the door to help customers with disabilities and a new closing mechanism to make the door more robust.

The original version featured red trim panels and a red-domed roof. This colour was chosen for its high visibility, and also to recall the red colour of the iconic Post Office kiosks. In late 2003, BT introduced internet connectivity to select kiosks. These booths feature distinctive blue colour to distinguish them from kiosks with standard telephone equipment (see photo), and also carry the BT Openzone logo. These kiosks have been described as perhaps "the last throw of the dice to save the telephone box", with Red Phone Box noting "the idea is good but the practicality isn't, you are unable to print out your internet findings in these boxes as a printer and paper would create mess." The payphone within the KX+ inside takes cash, phonecards, credit cards and chargecards, with these payment options clearly written on the outside of the box rather than using red or green colour coding which was the practice of the KX series as well as elder red telephone boxes that had been updated accordingly.

The first KX+ kiosks appeared in Autumn 1996, with the first being placed in London, and within its first year, over 5,000 KX+ kiosks had been installed. Its launch also saw the end of production for the KX100. Some KX100s went on to be retrofitted with KX+ style domes - in effect a cost-reduced model, known during its development as the K Excel but supplied as KX Minus. Both the KX+ and the KX Minus were designed by DCA and manufactured by GKN.

Later developments

Whilst the full 5,000 production of KX+ remain today, a successful scheme which took place around the same time as the introduction of the KX+ was to reinstall the iconic K6 design telephone boxes in places that have parted with them, with many places continuing to be reunited with K6s. BT phonecards with a magnetic stripe are no longer sold but it is still possible to use prepaid telephone cards in BT phone boxes by manually keying in the card access number and PIN. Another development that became possible after the deregulation of the telephone industry of 1996 was that many companies followed in Mercury Communications' footsteps by erecting their own kiosks, including Spectrum Interactive and Cable & Wireless. Perhaps in another attempt to sustain public usage of payphones, several modern BT payphone kiosks have a cash machine on one side, some of them, introduced in 2005, taking the shape of the KX+. In 2005, BT announced they were scrapping plans to remove 200 telephone boxes in rural Yorkshire owing to their importance to the geographically isolated areas.

BT also introduced a new type of phonecard telephone to be used in their phonecard-operated kiosks in 1996, the BT Payphone 2000, which was installed in high usage sites such as airports and railway stations. This payphone featured a large LCD display with information to assist the user. The on-screen language could be also changed between English, Welsh, French, Italian and Spanish languages to help users whose first language is not English. They also launched a series of internet payphones called the Multi.phone, also known as the Multiphone, in 1999. The touch screen terminals display a range of "hot buttons relevant to the needs of the modern traveller and consumer", with one of the buttons leading to BBC News Online. By January 2001, 600 Multi.phones were installed, but to revive the fortunes of their extensive network after usage fell 37% in two years, BT announced a six-month promotion during which the phones would be totally free for internet use. A BBC critic reviewed the Multi.phone in a negative light, saying it made the reviewer "nostalgic for the old callbox pips. Sometimes, as BT once put it so perfectly, "it's good to TALK"." After the six month free trial was over, keyboards were added to the Multi.phones.

Around the same time, they also introduced Britain's first credit card-operated public payphone, Creditcall, which like the Phonecard, was another cashless payphone service, enabling customers to make calls using major credit cards. It was installed on a trial basis in at Heathrow Airport and Waterloo station in London. In 2004, BT considered plans where their telephone boxes could be used to download music, turning them into "virtual jukeboxes", where anyone owning an iPod or portable music player would be able to go into a phonebox and download a song, being able to pay using a credit card or a BT charge card. The concept behind the boxes providing access to music was seen as an opportunity to attract mobile phone users, who long ago deserted phone boxes into BT facilities, Regardless, the plans were abandoned.

By 2017, the total number of BT owned telephone boxes had fallen to 40,000 with half of these under threat of scrapping over the following five years.

ST6

Whilst BT was reported to have stopped making telephone boxes in January 2001, citing loss of profits due to the increasing popularity in mobile phones, production had resumed by the time of the introduction of the ST6 (Street Talk 6) in June 2007, which seemingly saw the end of the KX series. The ST6, a collaboration between BT and public advertising company JCDecaux, is a unit that incorporates a telephone on one side and a scrolling advertising billboard on the reverse. The idea is that the advertising would pay for the running of the phone. The first ten ST6 kiosks were installed in Richmond and Ealing, London. BT announced in May 2012 that it was going to repair and restore 1,300 KX telephone boxes.

LinkUK
The latest venture from BT, in 2017, combining advertising hoarding with public telephone service was the LinkUK kiosk - an electronic advertising hoarding with a tablet, two USB charging ports, and a phone providing free calling to UK numbers (plus free WiFi).

See also
Telephone booth
Red telephone box
BT
Phonecard

References

Public phones
1985 establishments in the United Kingdom
Commercial machines
Telecommunications in the United Kingdom
Street furniture
British culture
Telecommunications-related introductions in 1985
Controversies in the United Kingdom
British Telecom buildings and structures